Hristo Iliev may refer to:
 Hristo Iliev (footballer) (1936–1974), Bulgarian footballer
 Hristo Iliev (volleyball) (born 1951), Bulgarian former volleyball player
 Hristo Iliev Iliev (football president) (born 1982), President of Bulgarian football team Botev Vratsa